Miiduranna is a village in Viimsi Parish, Harju County in northern Estonia. As of 2011 Census, the settlement's population was 358. It is one of the wealthiest regions in Estonia.

Half of the village's area is occupied by the Miiduranna Harbour, which is connected to Maardu via railroad.

Miiduranna was first mentioned in 1588 as Mitorannes.

Miiduranna is connected to the centre of Tallinn by Tallinn Bus Company's route nr. 1A (Viru keskus – Viimsi Keskus), average traveling time is about 25 minutes.

References

External links
Port of Miiduranna

Villages in Harju County